Amb. Mohamed Abdi Affey born 1968 in Wajir County, northeastern Kenya, is a politician who is currently serving as the United Nations High Commissioner for Refugees (UNHCR) Special Envoy for the Horn of Africa and former UNHCR Special Envoy to the Somalia Refugee situation. Before joining UNHCR, Ambassador Affey was the IGAD'S Special Envoy to Somalia and a former member of Parliament for Wajir South Constituency (1997-2002).  He also served as nominated member of parliament (2008-2013) for ODM-Kenya, Kenyan Ambassador to Somalia (2003-2007) and Deputy Minister of the Ministry of Foreign Affairs of Kenya (1997-2002).

Education
Amb. Affey hold a master's degree in International Conflict Management from the University of Nairobi and a bachelor's degree in Sociology and Political Science from Kenyatta University. He speaks fluently Somali, English and Kiswahili.

Political life

At 27 years old, Affey was one of the youngest politicians in Kenya's history to be elected to Parliament, representing Wajir South constituency on a KANU Party ticket. He served a stint in the Ministry of Foreign Affairs as Deputy Minister from 1997 to 2002.
On 2002, Affey tried to defend his nominated parliamentary seat on a KANU ticket but lost in the primaries. In July 2003, President Mwai Kibaki appointed him as Kenya's Ambassador to Somalia, a position he held until May 2007 before he resigned to become the IGAD’s Special Envoy to Somalia.

In 2016, Ambassador Affey was appointed by the High Commissioner for Refugees, Filippo Grandi, to become the UNHCR Special Envoy to the Somalia Refugee situation, one of the most protracted refugee situation in the world. During his mandate, he actively participated in the development and implementation of the IGAD Nairobi Declaration for Refugees, aiming to deliver durable solutions for more than 900,000 Somali refugees as well as over a million displaced persons within Somalia.

In 2018, he got appointed to the become the first UNHCR Special Envoy for the Horn of Africa, covering the eight IGAD countries. His mandate consists mainly in political advocacy to find durable solutions for the displaced population in the Horn of Africa but it is also extended to parliamentary engagement, resource mobilization and stakeholder engagement (including the private sector, diaspora and celebrities).

The UNHCR Special Envoy for the Horn of Africa is currently based in Nairobi but often travels in the region and worldwide to perform his mandate.

References

1968 births
Living people
Ambassadors of Kenya to Somalia
People from Wajir County
Kenyan people of Somali descent
Kenya African National Union politicians
University of Nairobi alumni
United Nations High Commissioner for Refugees officials